Ben Reiter (born June 27, 1987) is an American mixed martial artist currently competing in the Heavyweight division. A professional since 2011, he has competed for Bellator.

Background
Raised in Smithtown, New York, Reiter attended Smithtown High School, where he competed in wrestling. Talented, he later continued the sport for the University of Pennsylvania, graduating in 2009.

Mixed martial arts career

Early career
Prior to signing with Bellator, Reiter competed mainly in Peru, for the Inka Fighting Championship promotion. He went undefeated, compiling a record of 14–0–1. The only blemish on his record was a draw with Marcos Rogério de Lima.

Bellator MMA
In his promotional debut for Bellator MMA, Reiter defeated Shamir Garcia via unanimous decision at Bellator 124 on September 12, 2014.

Reiter defeated veteran Benji Radach, via unanimous decision, at Bellator 137 on May 15, 2015. Reiter was originally scheduled to face A.J. Matthews at the event, but Matthews sustained an injury and was replaced with Radach.

Reiter received his first professional loss against Francisco France at Bellator 146 on November 20, 2015, submitting to a rear-naked choke.

Reiter/Matthews took place at Bellator 156 on June 17, 2015, which Reiter won via a unanimous decision. Reiter dominated the bout on the ground, almost getting a stoppage due to ground-and-pound towards the end of the third round and even hurting his opponent on the feet at one point.

Reiter faced Chris Honeycutt at Bellator 166 on December 2, 2016. Unable to stop Honeycutt's relentless strikes and takedowns, Reiter lost the one-sided fight via unanimous decision.

On February 20, 2018 it was announced that Bellator had released Reiter from the promotion.

Personal life
Reiter resides in Lima, Peru with his wife and two kids. Reiter is also a Senior Director of Advancement for "Beat The Streets," an organization serving underprivileged youth in Philadelphia.

Mixed martial arts record

|-
|Loss
|align=center|17–3–1
|Shawn Teed
|TKO (punches)
|CCFC 79: Sabatini vs. Chaulet
|
|align=center|3
|align=center|2:27
|Atlantic City, New Jersey, United States
|Heavyweight bout; for the vacant Cage Fury FC Heavyweight Championship.
|-
|Loss
|align=center|17–2–1
|Chris Honeycutt
|Decision (unanimous)
|Bellator 166
|
|align=center|3
|align=center|5:00
|Thackerville, Oklahoma, United States
|Catchweight (195 lbs) bout.
|-
|Win
|align=center|17–1–1
|A.J. Matthews
|Decision (unanimous)
|Bellator 156
|
|align=center|3
|align=center|5:00
|Fresno, California, United States
|
|-
|Loss
|align=center|16–1–1
|Francisco France
|Submission (rear-naked choke)
|Bellator 146
|
|align=center|2
|align=center|1:08
|Thackerville, Oklahoma, United States
|
|-
|Win
|align=center|16–0–1
|Benji Radach
|Decision (unanimous)
|Bellator 137
|
|align=center|3
|align=center|5:00
|Temecula, California, United States
|
|-
|Win
|align=center|15–0–1
|Shamir Garcia
|Decision (unanimous)
|Bellator 124
|
|align=center|3
|align=center|5:00
|Plymouth Township, Michigan, United States
|Return to Middleweight.
|-
|Win
|align=center|14–0–1
|Danilo Pereira
|Decision (unanimous)
|Inka FC 25
|
|align=center|3
|align=center|5:00
|Miraflores, Lima, Peru
|
|-
|Win
|align=center|13–0–1
|Adam Rodriguez
|TKO (punches)
|RDC MMA: Reto de Campeones 3
|
|align=center|1
|align=center|0:56
|Mexico City, Mexico
|Heavyweight bout.
|-
|Win
|align=center|12–0–1
|Amilcar Alves
|Decision (unanimous)
|SFE 2
|
|align=center|3
|align=center|5:00
|Quito, Ecuador
|SFE Middleweight (194 lbs) bout.
|-
|Win
|align=center|11–0–1
|Fabio Marongiu
|TKO (doctor stoppage)
|300 Sparta: MMA 3
|
|align=center|2
|align=center|N/A
|Lima, Peru
|
|-
|Draw
|align=center|10–0–1
|Marcos Rogério de Lima
|Draw
|Inka FC 22
|
|align=center|3
|align=center|5:00
|Lima, Peru
|
|-
|Win
|align=center|10–0
|Aldo Silva
|Decision (unanimous)
|Inka FC 20
|
|align=center|3
|align=center|5:00
|Lima, Peru
|
|-
|Win
|align=center|9–0
|Raimundo Moreno Lima Jr.
|Submission (keylock)
|Inka FC 19
|
|align=center|1
|align=center|2:24
|Santiago de Surco, Lima, Peru
|
|-
|Win
|align=center|8–0
|Fernando di Pierro
|Decision (unanimous)
|Inka FC 18
|
|align=center|3
|align=center|5:00
|Santiago de Surco, Lima, Peru
|
|-
|Win
|align=center|7–0
|Tyson Triplett
|TKO (elbows)
|Matrix Fights 6
|
|align=center|1
|align=center|2:00
|Philadelphia, Pennsylvania, United States
|Middleweight bout.
|-
|Win
|align=center|6–0
|Joao Paulo Pereira
|TKO (punches)
|Inka FC 16
|
|align=center|1
|align=center|1:12
|Santiago de Surco, Lima, Peru
|
|-
|Win
|align=center|5–0
|Daniel Aspe
|Submission (rear-naked choke)
|Inka FC 14
|
|align=center|1
|align=center|1:27
|Lima, Peru
|
|-
|Win
|align=center|4–0
|Vinicius Carvalho
|TKO (punches)
|Inka FC 13
|
|align=center|1
|align=center|3:53
|Santiago de Surco, Lima, Peru
|
|-
|Win
|align=center|3–0
|Fernando di Pierro
|Decision (unanimous)
|Inka FC 12
|
|align=center|3
|align=center|5:00
|Santiago de Surco, Lima, Peru
|
|-
|Win
|align=center|2–0
|Fernando Roca Duany
|TKO (punches)
|Inka FC 12
|
|align=center|1
|align=center|2:27
|Santiago de Surco, Lima, Peru
|
|-
|Win
|align=center|1–0
|Fernando Roca Duany
|TKO (punches)
|Inka FC 11
|
|align=center|2
|align=center|0:44
|Santiago de Surco, Lima, Peru
|
|-

References

Living people
1987 births
American male mixed martial artists
Middleweight mixed martial artists
Mixed martial artists utilizing collegiate wrestling
American male sport wrestlers